August Charles Krey (June 29, 1887 – July 28, 1961) was an American medievalist. He was chairman of the Department of History at the University of Minnesota from 1944 to 1955.

Biography 

Born in Germany, he immigrated to Wisconsin with his family as a child. He earned all his degrees from the University of Wisconsin between 1907 and 1914. He taught at the University of Texas (1910) and at the University of Illinois (1912). In 1913, he joined the University of Minnesota, where he spent the rest of his career, heading the Department of History from 1944 until his retirement in 1955. He was a member of the council of the American Historical Association and a member of the Medieval Academy of America.

Krey took a leading role in the definition of the social studies program in US schools, first as chairman of the American Historical Association's Committee on History in the Schools (1925-1929) and later as chairman of the Commission on the Social Studies in the Schools (1929-1934).

He was married with two children.

Bibliography 

Krey coauthored with Emily Atwater Babcock the translation of William of Tyre's chronicle published in 1943 under the title A History of Deeds Done Beyond the Sea.

Some of his notable books are as follows.

 The First Crusade: The Accounts of Eyewitnesses and Participants
 History and the Social Web: A Collection of Essays 
 Parallel Source Problems in Medieval History 
 German War Practices: Treatment of Civilians

References 

American medievalists
University of Wisconsin–Madison alumni
University of Minnesota faculty
University of Illinois Urbana-Champaign faculty
University of Texas faculty
1887 births
1961 deaths
Historians from Minnesota
Historians from Wisconsin
German emigrants to the United States